Dream Street is an American drama television series created by Mark Rosner that aired on NBC from April 13, 1989, to June 7, 1989. The series was filmed on location in Hoboken, New Jersey, and was executive produced by Thirtysomething creators Edward Zwick and Marshall Herskovitz.

Synopsis
Dream Street focused on a group of blue collar twenty-somethings who live and love in Hoboken, New Jersey.

Cast
Dale Midkiff as Denis DeBeau
Peter Frechette as Harry DeBeau
 David Barry Gray as Eric DeBeau
Tom Signorelli as Pete DeBeau
Thomas Calabro as Joey Coltrera
Cecil Hoffman as Joni Goldstein
Jo Anderson as Marianne McKinney
Victor Argo as Anthoney Coltrera
Debra Mooney as Lillian DeBeau

Episodes

References

External links
 

1989 American television series debuts
1989 American television series endings
1980s American drama television series
English-language television shows
NBC original programming
Television shows filmed in New Jersey
Television shows set in New Jersey